Thorunna horologia is a species of sea slug, a dorid nudibranch, a shell-less marine gastropod mollusk in the family Chromodorididae.

Distribution 
This species was described from Dar Es Salaam, Tanzania. It has been reported from South Africa and Réunion.

Description

Ecology

References

Chromodorididae
Gastropods described in 1984